Edythe or Edyth is a female given name. It may refer to:

Edythe
Edythe Baker (1899–1971), American pianist
Edythe Chapman (1863–1948), American stage and silent film actress from Rochester, New York
Edythe D. London, Professor of Psychiatry and Behavioral Studies at the University of California at Los Angeles
Edythe Lewis, the first black, woman disc jockey in Dayton, Ohio, in the 1950s
Edythe Morahan de Lauzon, Canadian poet
Edythe Shuttleworth (1907–1983), Canadian mezzo-soprano
Edythe Wright (1916–1965), singer who worked with Tommy Dorsey

Edyth
Edyth H. Schoenrich (1919–2020), American physician and educator
Edyth Starkie (1867–1941), Irish portrait painter and sculptor 
Edyth Walker (1867–1950), American opera singer

See also
Edith